This is a list of lighthouses in United Arab Emirates.

Lighthouses

See also
 Lists of lighthouses and lightvessels

References

External links
 

United Arab Emirates
Lighthouses
Lighthouses